Planty is one of the largest city parks in Kraków, Poland. It encircles the Stare Miasto (Old Town), where the Medieval city walls used to stand until the early 19th century. The historic Old Town is not to be confused with the Administrative District No. 1 Stare Miasto extending further east.

 
It consists of a chain of thirty smaller gardens designed in varied styles and adorned with numerous monuments and fountains. There are over twenty statues of noble historical figures in the park – monuments of Nicolaus Copernicus, Jan Matejko, queen Jadwiga and king Wladyslaw II Jagiello, just to name a few. There are also several plaques in the park commemorating, among others, Jan Dlugosz and Stanislaw Wyspianski.

The park forms a scenic walkway popular with Cracovians. In summer, sprinkled with ponds and refreshment stalls, it is a cool and shady retreat from the nearby bustling streets. 

Most historic sites of the old Kraków are located inside the Planty-park-belt along the Royal Road crossing the park from the medieval suburb of Kleparz – through Florian Gate – at the northern flank of the old city walls. The historic Wawel Castle at the Wawel Hill, adjacent to Vistula River meander, form the southernmost border of Planty.

History
The green belt was established in place of the medieval walls between 1822–1830 as part of the urban development projects to preserve the concept of a "garden city". 

By the beginning of the 19th century the expanding city had begun to outgrow the confines of the old defensive walls. The walls had been falling into disrepair due to lack of maintenance after the Partitions of Poland. As a result, Emperor Franz I of Austro-Hungary ordered the dismantling of the old fortifications. However, in 1817 Professor Feliks Radwański of Jagiellonian University managed to convince the Session of the Senate of the Republic of Kraków to legislate the partial preservation of the old fortifications, namely, the Florian Gate and the adjoining Barbican, one of only three such fortified outposts still surviving in Europe.

References

 About the city walls at krakow4u.pl dated 1 March 2006 in Polish. Retrieved on April 23, 2008.
 Planty Garden Ring, undated. Retrieved on April 23, 2008.

Parks in Kraków